John Baptist Odama (born 20 July 1947) is a Ugandan Roman Catholic priest, who serves as the Archbishop of the Roman Catholic Archdiocese of Gulu, in Uganda, since 2 January 1999.

Background and priesthood
Odama was born in Riki-Oluko Village, in present-day Arua District, in the West Nile sub-region, in the Northern Region of Uganda on 29 June 1947. He was ordained priest in the Catholic church on 14 December 1974, at Arua Cathedral, by Bishop Angelo Tarantino, Bishop of Arua. He served as priest of Arua Diocese until 23 February 1996.

As bishop
On 23 February 1996, Pope John Paul II appointed Odama bishop. He was consecrated Bishop of the Roman Catholic Diocese of Nebbi, on 26 May 1996, serving in that capacity until 2 January 1999.	

On 2 January 1999, he was appointed Archbishop of the Roman Catholic Archdiocese of Gulu, being the first Catholic prelate to serve in that role; the Archdiocese having been created that same day.		

Odama was the chairman of the interfaith organisation known as Acholi Religious Leaders Peace Initiative (ARLPI), from 2002 until 2010. The organisation was involved in peace-building efforts in Northern Uganda. As leader of the organisation, Odama met with Joseph Kony and other leaders of the Lord’s Resistance Army and mediated between them and the Government of Uganda. ARLPI received the Niwano Peace Prize in 2004. Odama was also involved in the 2006–08 Juba talks between the two parties in South Sudan.

Archbishop Odama has been the chairman of the Uganda Episcopal Conference since 2010.

Other responsibilities
As of January 2020, Archbishop Odama is the Chancellor of Uganda Martyrs University, a private university affiliated with the Roman Catholic Church in Uganda and whose main campus is in Mpigi District, Uganda.

See also
 Roman Catholicism in Uganda
 Uganda Martyrs

References

External links

21st-century Roman Catholic archbishops in Uganda
1947 births
Living people
People from Arua District
People from West Nile sub-region
20th-century Roman Catholic bishops in Uganda
Roman Catholic bishops of Nebbi
Roman Catholic archbishops of Gulu
Ugandan Roman Catholic archbishops